Condalia correllii, also called Correll's snakewood, is a shrub belonging to the family Rhamnaceae.

The fruit is generally a deep violet-black. Leaves are linear, and it belongs to what Marshall Conring Johnston terms the linear-leaved group.

Distribution
Correll's snakewood ranges across the Southwestern United States and into Northwestern Mexico, where it commonly occurs at  higher elevations than Condalia globosa, generally .

Uses
It has been considered as a low water native landscape plant. It provides useful cover and forage for fruit eating birds. Flowers are notably fragrant.

References

correllii